Julie Thomas (born 9 July 1967) is a Welsh lawn bowler.

Thomas was a head teacher at a primary school until she lost her sight She only took up the sport in 2014 and 2 months later won her first Welsh title. Thomas went on to win her first British Isles title in 2015 taking a Gold medal in the B2 category. She was the first Welsh Para athlete to hold an Indoor and Outdoor title at the same time. Thomas has won 4 Gold medals since.

She competed at the 2018 Commonwealth Games where she won a bronze medal in the mixed para-sport pairs event alongside Gilbert Miles.

References

External links
 
 

1967 births
Living people
Welsh female bowls players
Bowls players at the 2018 Commonwealth Games
Commonwealth Games bronze medallists for Wales
Commonwealth Games medallists in lawn bowls
Heads of schools in Wales
Sportspeople with a vision impairment
Medallists at the 2018 Commonwealth Games